Hans Rupprecht Goette (born 1956 in Soest, West Germany) is a German classical archaeologist.

Life
Hans Rupprecht Goette studied classical archaeology, Latin philology and history from 1975 to 1982 at the universities of Cologne, Bonn, Munich and Göttingen.

Works 
 Studien zu römischen Togadarstellungen, von Zabern, Mainz 1990 (Beiträge zur Erschließung hellenistischer und kaiserzeitlicher Skulptur und Architektur, Bd. 10) 
 Athen, Attika, Megaris. Reiseführer zu den Kunstschätzen und Kulturdenkmälern im Zentrum Griechenlands, Böhlau, Köln-Weimar-Wien 1993 
 englisch: Athens, Attica and the Megarid. An archaeological guide, Routledge, London-New York 2001 
 mit Adrian Zimmermann: Der Wandel archäologischer Denkmäler in historischen und zeitgenössischen Photographien. Eine Ausstellung in der Archäologischen Sammlung der Universität Zürich, Archäologische Sammlung der Universität Zürich, Zürich 1995 
 Ho axiologos dēmos sunion = Landeskundliche Studien in Südost-Attika, Leidorf, Rahden 2000 (Internationale Archäologie, Bd. 59) 
 Herausgeber: Ancient roads in Greece.Proceedings of a symposion organized by the Cultural Association Aigeas (Athens) and the German Archaeological Institute (Athens) with the support of the German School at Athens, Kovač, Hamburg 2002 (Schriftenreihe Antiquates, Bd. 21) 
 with Jürgen Hammerstaedt: Das antike Athen. Ein literarischer Stadtführer. Beck, München 2004, 
 with Thomas Maria Weber: Marathon. Siedlungskammer und Schlachtfeld - Sommerfrische und olympische Wettkampfstätte, von Zabern, Mainz 2004 (Sonderbände zur Antike Welt/Zaberns Bildbände zur Archäologie) 
 with Günther Schörner: Die Pan-Grotte von Vari, von Zabern, Mainz 2004 (Schriften zur historischen Landeskunde Griechenlands, Bd. 1) 
 Editor with Olga Palagia: Ludwig Ross und Griechenland. Akten des internationalen Kolloquiums, Leidorf, Rahden 2005 (Internationale Archäologie. Studia honoraria, Bd. 24)

External links 
 Portrait on the Universität Gießen website
 Portrait on the DAI website

1956 births
Living people
People from Soest, Germany
Archaeologists from North Rhine-Westphalia
Classical archaeologists
University of Cologne alumni
University of Bonn alumni
Ludwig Maximilian University of Munich alumni
University of Göttingen alumni